A sofer, sopher, sofer SeTaM, or sofer ST"M ("scribe"; plural of  is) is a Jewish scribe who can transcribe Sifrei Kodesh (holy scrolls), tefillin (phylacteries), mezuzot (ST"M, is an abbreviation of these three terms) and other religious writings. 

By simple definition, soferim are copyists, but their religious role in Judaism is much more.

In the Torah's 613 commandments, the second to last is that every Jew should write a sefer Torah before they die.

Qualifications and education
A sofer must be religiously observant, of good character, and knowledgeable about the laws concerning sofrut. It is a common misconception that one has to be a rabbi in order to become a sofer.

People who want to become ritual scribes usually learn from another expert scribe by undergoing  (apprenticeship), since it would be impossible for someone to be a scribe without any actual practice. Newly certified scribes write Megilat Esther scrolls. The hardest part about learning to be a sofer is not the calligraphy, but, rather, remembering the thousands of laws that apply to sifrei Torah, tefillin, mezuzot, and all the other texts that are written on parchment.

This process does, however, ensure that a certified sofer has received the proper education and is a recognized expert in the field of sofrut.

Texts teaching sofrut

Sephardic soferim rely, in addition to Mishneh Torah (Hilchot Tefillin u'Mezuzah v'Sefer Torah, Hilchot Tzitzit), on Arba'ah Turim, and Shulchan Arukh.

Baladi Rite Yemenite (Teimani) scribes try to follow as closely as possible only the instruction of the Rambam, i.e. Mishneh Torah (Hilchot Tefillin u'Mezuzah v'Sefer Torah, Hilchot Tzitzit), though before Mishneh Torah, their standard was based on the Rama, i.e. Rabbi Meir ben Todros HaLevy Abulafia.

Women and sofrut
Forming the basis for the discussion of women becoming soferim, Talmud  45b states, "Sifrei Torah, tefillin and mezuzot written by a heretic, a star-worshipper, a slave, a woman, a minor, a Cuthean, or an apostate Jew, are unfit for ritual use." The rulings on mezuzot and tefillin are virtually undisputed among those who hold to the Talmud. While Arba'ah Turim does not include women in its list of those ineligible to write Sifrei Torah, some see this as proof that women are permitted to write a sefer Torah. However, today, virtually all Orthodox (both Modern and Ultra) authorities contest the permissibility of a woman's writing a sefer Torah. Yet, women are permitted to inscribe Ketubot (marriage contracts), STaM not intended for ritual use, and other writings of  beyond simple STaM. In 2003, Canadian Aviel Barclay became the world's first known, traditionally trained, soferet. 

Among non-Orthodox Jews, women have written Torah scrolls since the early 2000s. In 2007 Jen Taylor Friedman, a British woman, became the first woman to scribe a sefer Torah. In 2010, the first sefer Torah scribed by a group of six women (from Brazil, Canada, Israel, and the United States) was completed; this was known as the Women's Torah Project. Since then, other women have written Torah scrolls. , there were an estimated 50 female sofers around the world.

Documents written by scribes

In some communities, especially Chaim Kanievsky's community in Bnei Brak, soferim also write the other books of the Bible, such as Psalms or the Book of Ezra. This was promoted in 19th-century Jerusalem by Rabbi Shemuel Shelomo Boyarski.

Calligraphy and lettering

There are many rules concerning the proper formation of letters that must be followed if a written text is to be deemed religiously valid. The Ashkenazi, Sefardi, Chabad (Lubavitch), and Mizrahi Jews each have their own script for forming the letters, though the same rules apply throughout the text. Generally, regarding sifrei Torah, none of these groups would consider that these differences would render a Torah  (ritually unfit or invalid).

The documents must be written on properly prepared parchment or vellum known as klaf.

Many scribes also function as calligraphers—writing functional documents like ketubot, or ornamental and artistic renditions of religious texts—which do not require any scribal qualifications, and to which the rules on lettering and parchment specifications do not apply.

See also
 List of sofers
 Scribe
 Tiqqun soferim

References and notes

External links
 Vaad Mishmereth STaM
 What makes ST"M pasul
 Overview of a sofer's work www.sofer.co.uk
 Learning to be a sofer
 Machon Melechet Shamayim Sofer Stam School

Jewish law and rituals
Jewish religious occupations
Hebrew calligraphy
Hebrew words and phrases